Jaypuri Gharti is a Nepalese politician, belonging to the Communist Party of Nepal. In the 2008 Constituent Assembly election she was elected from the Rolpa-1 constituency, winning 26505 votes.

References

Living people
Communist Party of Nepal (Maoist Centre) politicians
21st-century Nepalese women politicians
21st-century Nepalese politicians
Nepal MPs 2017–2022
Nepal Communist Party (NCP) politicians
Members of the 1st Nepalese Constituent Assembly
1973 births